Leqinat or Lićenat (Serbian and Montenegrin Cyrillic: Лићенат), is a mountain in western Kosovo and eastern Montenegro, in the Prokletije range, with a top height of .

Two-thousanders of Kosovo
Two-thousanders of Montenegro
Accursed Mountains